Moral example is trust in the moral core of another, a role model.  It was cited by Confucius, Muhammad, Mohandas Gandhi and other important philosophers and theologians as the prime duty of a ruler - including the head of a family or the owner of a business.  

It is the case that since the exact circumstances and decisions of the lives of such moral examples cannot be reproduced or repeated, followers are often reduced to following their etiquette and customs, e.g. in ancestor worship.

Storytelling can take a central role in any culture built on moral example, particularly when the provider of the moral example does not refer to an explicit ethical theory or philosophy as the basis for his behavior. A complex culture built on such stories can fall prey to a clique of experts who interpret them for the lay public.  This has led in the past to institutions that sort through anecdotes to decide which of them are true, e.g. isnad in Islam by which the hadith are validated.

Christians still see Jesus as the ultimate divine example- in Epistle to the Hebrews: "looking unto Jesus the author and finisher of our faith" (12:2).

See also
 Civics
 Ethics
 Etiquette
 Moral code
 Moral core
 Role model
 Virtue ethics

Leadership
Example
Virtue